Highway 4 (Kvish Arba' ) is an Israeli highway that runs along Israel's entire coastal plain of the Mediterranean Sea, from the Rosh HaNikra border crossing with Lebanon in the North to the Erez Border Crossing with the Gaza Strip in the South. The highway follows in part the route of the ancient Via Maris.

Until the 1990s and the withdrawal of Israel Defense Forces from most of the Gaza Strip due to the Oslo Accords, Highway 4 continued all the way until Rafah and the Egyptian border. The part of the remaining highway in the Gaza Strip is called the Salah al-Din Road.

Although the highway is continuous, it is generally considered to be divided into five sections, each with its own nickname and characteristics such as a differing number of lanes and speed limits:
Northern Coastal Highway (Rosh Hanikra–Haifa). This section passes through the Krayot, Acre and Nahariya in Northern Israel. The southern third of the highway bisects the densely populated Krayot area and frequently experienced heavy traffic congestion until Highway 22, a bypass freeway located several kilometers to the east of Highway 4 was constructed in the early 2010s.
 Haifa–Tel Aviv Highway (Haifa–Ra'anana). Commonly referred to in Israel as The Old Highway while Highway 2 is sometimes called The New Highway. The construction of this section started in the early 1930s, and by 1936, it had reached Khirbat Bayt Lid. During the 1936–39 Arab revolt in Palestine, the construction speed greatly increased in order to allow Jewish traffic from Tel Aviv and Petah Tikva to Haifa to bypass the Arab towns of Qalqilyah, Tulkarm and Jenin. The highway opened to traffic on 30 September 1937, reducing the travel distance between Tel Aviv and Haifa from 140 to 106 km. The distance was further reduced to 96 km by 1942, when a direct road opened between Hadera and Binyamina bypassing Pardes Hanna.
Geha Highway, or First President Road (Ra'anana–Azor). This functions as an important arterial road in the eastern portion of the Tel Aviv Metropolitan Area. Designed as a shortcut to replace the southern section of the Old Haifa–Tel Aviv Highway, the construction of Geha Highway started in 1951, and was completed in 1968. The replaced section of the Old Highway was then re-designated as the northern section of Highway 40, and later in 2002, as Highway 402.
Tel Aviv–Ashdod Highway (Azor–Ashdod) was constructed in the early 1970s to relieve congestion on Highway 42, caused by the freight traffic to the Port of Ashdod which opened in 1965.
Southern Coastal Highway (Ashdod–Erez Crossing) is the oldest section of the highway: a road along this route had existed since before the Second World War.

The Tel Aviv–Ashdod and Geha sections are freeways. The rest of the highway consists of multiple lanes in each direction except between Erez Crossing and Yad Mordechai, Rosh HaNikra and Nahariya, and between Tirat Carmel just south of Haifa and Fureidis, which have a single lane of traffic in each direction. While there have been multiple proposals to widen the Haifa–Fureidis section, these have so far been blocked due to opposition from nearby residents who would like the highway in the area to retain its current rural character.

Current and planned construction

As of 2016, Netivei Yisrael is planning a multi-billion Shekel project to convert the Sharon section of the highway (between the Dror Interchange and Highway 65 north of Hadera) into a freeway. The project includes a massive interchange at the junction with Highway 57 and a long cut-and-cover tunnel with a road and intersections above it at the entrance to Hadera to separate local and intercity traffic.

Junctions and interchanges

References

Limited-access roads in Israel
Roads in Israel